Neil Archibald Primrose, 7th Earl of Rosebery, 3rd Earl of Midlothian (born 11 February 1929), styled Lord Primrose between 1931 and 1974, is a Scottish nobleman. He was a member of the House of Lords from 1974 to 1999. His son and heir is Harry Primrose, Lord Dalmeny.

Biography
He is the only surviving son of Harry, Earl of Rosebery. His paternal grandfather was Archibald Primrose, 5th Earl of Rosebery, the Liberal Prime Minister of the United Kingdom from 1894 to 1895. His paternal grandmother was the heiress Hannah, Countess of Rosebery (daughter of Mayer de Rothschild), who was regarded as the richest woman in England in the late 19th century.

After the death of his elder half-brother Ronald in 1931, he became heir apparent to his father and was styled Lord Primrose, as the courtesy title Lord Dalmeny was reserved out of respect for his late elder brother. During World War II he was educated at Sandroyd School before being evacuated to America, attending the Millbrook School in Millbrook, N.Y. (A slightly older student who attended at the same time, writer William F. Buckley Jr., would remark in a magazine article in 1981 that the young lord had been an uncontrollable "brat".) Afterward, he was educated at Stowe School and New College, Oxford.

He married Alison Mary Deirdre Reid in 1955. He was appointed a deputy lieutenant of Midlothian in 1960 and succeeded his father as earl in 1974.

Rosebery currently resides at the family seat Dalmeny House near Edinburgh with his wife. The Earl and Countess of Rosebery have five children, four daughters and a son. The Countess is a patroness of the Royal Caledonian Ball. Their son and youngest child, Harry, bears the courtesy title Lord Dalmeny as heir to the Rosebery earldoms, viscountcies and baronies.

References

External links

The Peerage

1929 births
Living people
People educated at Sandroyd School
Earls of Rosebery
Scottish people of German-Jewish descent
Midlothian, Neil Primrose, 3rd Earl of
Neil

Rosebery